Reynolds syndrome is a rare secondary laminopathy, consisting of the combination of primary biliary cirrhosis and progressive systemic sclerosis.  In some patients this syndrome has also been associated with Sjögren's syndrome and hemolytic anemia.  Typical clinical features include jaundice, elevated blood levels of alkaline phosphatase, calcinosis cutis, telangiectasias, and pruritus. This disease may cause white or yellow-ish spots on the arms or legs. The syndrome, a special case of scleroderma, is named after the American physician, Telfer B. Reynolds, MD (1921–2004), who first described it.  He is also known for creating one of the world's first hepatology programs at the University of Southern California.

It should not be confused with the more common Raynaud's phenomenon.

References

 T. B. Reynolds, E. K. Denison, H. D. Frank, F. L. Lieberman, R. L. Peters:  Primary biliary cirrhosis with scleroderma, Raynaud's phenomenon and telangiectasia. New syndrome. American Journal of Medicine, New York, 1971, 50 (3): 302–312.
 Volker Stadie, Johannes Wohlrab, Wolfgang Christian Marsch: The Reynolds Syndrome - a Rare Combination of Two Autoimmune Diseases. Medizinische Klinik, München, 2002, 97 (1): 40–43.

External links 

Autoimmune diseases
Digestive diseases
Hepatology
Rheumatology
Syndromes
Rare diseases